Zgornja Voličina (in older sources Zgornja Veličina) is a settlement in the Slovene Hills in the Municipality of Lenart in northeastern Slovenia. The area is part of the traditional region of Styria and is now included in the Drava Statistical Region.

References

External links
Zgornja Voličina on Geopedia

Populated places in the Municipality of Lenart